Thormahlen, Thormählen is a Swedish surname. Notable people with the surname include:

Edmund Thormählen (1865–1946), Swedish sailor
Erika Thormahlen (born 1983), American actress, writer, and child educator
Hank Thormahlen (1896–1955), American baseball player

Swedish-language surnames